Björn Holmgren is a Swedish singer. In 2022, his music single ”Ut med allt” peaked at number one on Sverigetopplistan. Holmgren initially started his career on Tiktok. Holmgren also auditioned for Idol 2016.

Discography

Singles

Notes

References

Living people
Year of birth missing (living people)
Swedish singers